Benjamin Griggs (16901768) was one of the earliest European settlers of the area that would later be known as Griggstown in Franklin Township, Somerset County, New Jersey, United States. The community takes its name after the grist mill that Griggs  established on the Millstone River.

Biography 

Benjamin Griggs was one of four sons born to John and Elizabeth Griggs in Gravesend, Brooklyn. He migrated westward into New Jersey along with his brothers Daniel, Samuel, and Thomas after 1715.  Unlike his brothers, who became prominent farmers in the area, Benjamin established a mill on the Millstone River by 1733 that also served as a meeting place for the European settlers.

See also
Colonial history of New Jersey
British colonization of the Americas

References

1690 births
1768 deaths
People from Gravesend, Brooklyn
People from Franklin Township, Somerset County, New Jersey
People of colonial New Jersey
People of the Province of New York